Altavilla Vicentina is a town and comune in the province of Vicenza, Veneto, northern Italy. It is located southwest of Vicenza.

The town originates from a castle (Rocca) built in the Middle Ages over a hill at the feet of the Colli Berici, and now in ruins.

In the communal territory is the Villa Morosini, a picturesque Venetian villa. It was built in 1724 by architect Moroni for count Benedetto Valmarana.

References

External links 
 
 (Google Maps)

Cities and towns in Veneto